High School Rapper 3 is a South Korean Hip hop survival television show.

Contestants 

 Color key

Team Finalization - Your Personal Story (Episodes 2 - 3) 

Note :  Indicates student performance not shown.

Team Battle - Textbook Literature (Episodes 4-5) 

Note : * Contestant was eliminated.

Team Battle - Collaboration with Mentors (Episodes 5 - 6)

Semi-Final (Episode 7)

Final (Episode 8)

Notes

References 

High School Rapper 3 contestants
High School Rapper